Edward Burbank Weston, MD (July 31, 1846 – September 14, 1918) was an American archer and medical doctor, practicing obstetrics and gynecology in the Chicago suburb of Highland Park.  He competed in the men's double York round, men's double American round, and the men's team round at the 1904 Summer Olympics. His son, Edward Henry Weston, also competed in the same event.

References

1846 births
1918 deaths
Olympic archers of the United States
American male archers
Archers at the 1904 Summer Olympics
People from Gorham, Maine
Physicians from Maine
Sportspeople from Maine
Physicians from Chicago